Jimmi Simpson (born November 21, 1975) is an American actor. He is best known for his work on television, which includes recurring roles as Liam McPoyle on It's Always Sunny in Philadelphia (2005–2013), Lyle the Intern on The Late Show with David Letterman (2008–09), Mary Lightly on Psych (2009–13), Lloyd Lowery on Breakout Kings (2011–13), Jack Spaniel on The Newsroom (2014), Gavin Orsay on House of Cards (2014–15), and the younger William on Westworld (2016–2020). For the last role, he received a nomination for the 2018 Primetime Emmy Award for Outstanding Guest Actor in a Drama Series. In 2022, he starred in a television series adaptation of The Man Who Fell to Earth.

Simpson also starred as Soldier on SundanceTV's Hap and Leonard (2016), Detective Russell Poole on USA's Unsolved (2018), and James Schaeler on ePix's Perpetual Grace, LTD (2019). He received a nomination for the 2018 British Academy Television Award for Best Supporting Actor for his performance in the Black Mirror episode "USS Callister" (2017).

Simpson made his feature film debut in Loser (2000). Subsequent film roles have included Herbie: Fully Loaded (2005), Stay Alive (2006), Seraphim Falls, Zodiac (both 2007), The Invention of Lying (2009), Date Night (2010), Abraham Lincoln: Vampire Hunter (2012), White House Down, Knights of Badassdom (both 2013), Under the Silver Lake (2018), Unhinged (2020), Breaking News in Yuba County, and Silk Road (both 2021). On stage, Simpson's portrayal of Philo Farnsworth in The Farnsworth Invention (Broadway, 2007–08) earned him a Theatre World Award.

Early life
Simpson was born in Hackettstown, New Jersey, on November 21, 1975. He has two older brothers. He attended Hackettstown High School, where he took his first acting class. After graduating from Bloomsburg University with a BA in theater, he acted for four seasons at the Williamstown Theatre Festival in Williamstown, Massachusetts.

Career

2000–2007: Film debut and early television roles 

Simpson made his film debut at age 25 when he played Noah in the romantic comedy Loser (2000), directed by Amy Heckerling. This was followed by a supporting role in the Stephen King miniseries Rose Red in 2002 and appearances on television shows such as 24, NYPD Blue, Cold Case, Carnivàle, and It's Always Sunny in Philadelphia, where he played the recurring character Liam McPoyle over several seasons, beginning in 2005. Subsequent film roles during this period included the sports comedy Herbie: Fully Loaded (2005) opposite Lindsay Lohan, revisionist Western Seraphim Falls (2006) with Liam Neeson, and the David Fincher thriller Zodiac (2007).

2008–2015: Stage work and House of Cards 

In 2008, Simpson starred as Philo T. Farnsworth in a production of Aaron Sorkin's The Farnsworth Invention on Broadway, opposite Hank Azaria. His portrayal of Farnsworth was described as "superb" by The Chicago Tribune and earned him a Theatre World Award. That same year, he made the first of several appearances as Lyle—a fictional intern—on The Late Show with David Letterman, a role he frequented until November 2009. During that time he also played guest roles in episodes of CSI: Crime Scene Investigation, My Name is Earl, House, and Psych, and had supporting parts in the films The Invention of Lying (2009) and Date Night (2010). He later starred in one of the principal roles—Dr. Lloyd Lowery—on the A&E crime drama series Breakout Kings, which ran from 2011 to 2012.

Simpson's next projects were the films Hello I Must Be Going (2012), Abraham Lincoln: Vampire Hunter (2012), The Truth About Emanuel (2013), Knights of Badassdom (2013), and the Roland Emmerich action epic White House Down (2013). He then joined the cast of Netflix political thriller series House of Cards to play the recurring role of Gavin Orsay between 2014 and 2015. For this, Simpson was nominated on two occasions—alongside his co-stars—for the Screen Actors Guild Award for Outstanding Performance by an Ensemble in a Drama Series.

In 2015, Simpson starred with Laurie Metcalf in a Circle X Theatre production of Trevor, a play written by Nick Jones. Simpson's performance was roundly praised, with KCRW writing, "... you can't imagine the humanity that actor Jimmi Simpson brings to Trevor. Yes, it's a funny play and, yes, there's some 'monkey business' but Mr. Simpson's gift is restraint. Instead of playing for broad laughs, he plays Trevor's struggle for just that: an honest struggle".

2016–present: Westworld, Black Mirror, and continued film career 

Simpson starred as Soldier, a psychotic drug dealer, on the first season of SundanceTV's dark comedy-drama Hap and Leonard in 2016. That same year, he appeared in a principal role on the debut season of HBO's science fiction drama series Westworld. His portrayal of William, a businessman who visits the titular Wild West-themed amusement park and falls in love with one of its android inhabitants (played by Evan Rachel Wood), was described as "spellbinding" by Maureen Ryan of Variety. Simpson was once again nominated alongside his co-stars for an SAG Award in 2017, while his work on the show's second season earned him an Emmy Award nomination for Outstanding Guest Actor in a Drama Series.

In 2017, Simpson appeared as Walton—a lieutenant aboard the titular spaceship—in "USS Callister", the opening episode of the fourth season of anthology sci-fi series Black Mirror. In their review, Den of Geek called Simpson "one of [television's] best-kept secrets" and commented that his performance "pops off the screen". His portrayal of Walton earned him a nomination for the BAFTA Award for Best Supporting Actor the following year.

Simpson starred as the real-life Det. Russell Poole on Unsolved in 2018, a ten-part USA Network series based on the 1990s murders of rappers Tupac Shakur and Biggie Smalls. IndieWire praised the "elevated artistry" of Simpson's performance, while Vulture.com commented in their review: "In an ensemble this solid, it can be challenging for one performance to emerge as a standout. But Simpson's does because he so carefully calibrates Poole's intensity, dialing it up by slight degrees in each episode until he's radiating with panicky determination ... Simpson physically and emotionally illustrates [the character's] internal struggle beautifully".

Simpson's recent film work includes David Robert Mitchell's neo-noir black comedy Under the Silver Lake (2018), the action thriller Unhinged (2020)—where he starred opposite Russell Crowe—and the comedic crime drama Breaking News in Yuba County (2021). He also starred in the stop-motion AMC+ series Ultra City Smiths as Detective David Mills.

Simpson stars as Spencer Clay in the Showtime adaptation of The Man Who Fell to Earth, based on the 1963 novel of the same name.

In February 2023, Simpson guest voiced Doctor Royce Hemlock, the scientific director of the secret Imperial cloning facility on Mount Tantiss, in Star Wars: The Bad Batch.

Personal life
Simpson met New Zealand actress Melanie Lynskey in 2001 during the filming of Rose Red, in which they both appeared. They became engaged in 2005 and married on April 14, 2007, in a chapel on Lake Hayes, near Queenstown, New Zealand. Lynskey filed for divorce in September 2012, citing irreconcilable differences. It was finalised in May 2014.

Simpson married English actress Sophia Del Pizzo in April 2019. It was announced in July 2021 that the pair had split and that Simpson had filed for divorce.

Filmography

Film

Television

Video games

Awards and nominations

References

External links 
 
 

1975 births
20th-century American male actors
21st-century American male actors
American male film actors
American male television actors
American male voice actors
Bloomsburg University of Pennsylvania alumni
Hackettstown High School alumni

Living people
Male actors from New Jersey
People from Hackettstown, New Jersey
Theatre World Award winners